The Great Bear is a 1992 lithograph by Simon Patterson. At first glance the work looks like the London Underground Tube map, but Patterson uses each line to represent groups of people, including scientists, saints, philosophers, comedians, explorers and footballers.

The copyright of the work is shared between the artist and London Underground from whom the artist obtained permission after protracted negotiation.

A copy of The Great Bear can be found in the Tate Gallery. The work is in an edition of 50 with a small additional number of artist's proofs.

Responses
Ian Russell, writing in Images, representations and heritage: moving beyond modern approaches to archaeology in 2006, felt that the map emphasises that "the tube map distorts and masks realities". Social historian Joe Moran wrote in his 2005 work Reading the Everyday that the map "suggests that the tube map has become its own reality, entirely abstracted from the work it ostensibly represents". David Pike, author of 'Modernist Space and the Transformation of Underground London', expressed his belief that Patterson "discovered the dreams of modernism within the world of the 1990s in the same way that he found the dreams of the present lurking within the modernist space of Harry Beck's underground map", comparing the work to the writing of Iain Sinclair and the artwork of Mark Dion.

References

External links
The Great Bear (detail)
The Great Bear in the Tate Collection 

Lithographs
1992 works
Transport design in London
London Underground in popular culture